Al-Janiya is a Palestinian village in the Ramallah and al-Bireh Governorate located 8 kilometers northwest of Ramallah in the northern West Bank. According to the Palestinian Central Bureau of Statistics (PCBS), the village had a population of 1,400 inhabitants by late 2014.

Location
Al Janiya is located 8.5 km west of Ramallah. It  is bordered by Al-Zaytouneh and Ein Qiniya to the east, Ras Karkar and Kafr Ni'ma to the west, Al-Zaytouneh and Al-Itihad to the north, and Deir Ibzi to the south.

History
Shards from  the Iron Age II, Hellenistic, Roman and Byzantine era have been found here.  It has been suggested that this was Ganta, a village which belonged to Byzantine empress Eudocia (c. 401–460), who gave it to the Church of Jerusalem.

It has also been suggested that  Al-Janiya was the Crusader site named Megina. Shards have also been found here from the  Crusader/Ayyubid  and  Mamluk eras. There are Arabic and Greek inscriptions in the village mosque, which has been dated to 731 A.H., that is, 1330-31 C.E.

Ottoman era
Shards have been found here from the early Ottoman era. In the Ottoman census of 1500s, Dajjaniyya was  located in the nahiya of Quds.

In 1838 el-Janieh was noted as partly a Greek Christian and partly a Muslim village, part of Beni Harith area, located north of Jerusalem.

Al-Janiya, together with er-Ras, were the chief towns for the ruling family of Simhan. The chief Sheikh of the Simhan family was Isma'il, who was killed by Ibrahim Pasha in the 1834 uprising. After Isma'il, Hasan es-Sa'id and Mohammah ibn Isma'il became the rulers.

In 1870, Victor Guérin found it to be a village of 400 inhabitants, all Muslims except a few "Grec schismatique". He also suggested that the mosque stood on the site of a previous church. An Ottoman village list from about same year found that the village had  a population of 29 "Greeks" in 8 houses, and 268 Muslims in 58 houses, though the population count included men, only. It was noted that it was located NWW of Ramallah.

In 1882, the PEF's Survey of Western Palestine (SWP) described it: "A small village on high ground, with two Mukams and a well on the east; on the north is a modern graveyard. Olives exist round."

Two different estimates were given of the population of Ed-dschanije in 1896, one gave a population of 528, while another estimate gave the population to be 342 Muslims and 36 Christians.

British Mandate era
In the 1922 census of Palestine conducted by the British Mandate authorities, Al-Janiya had a population of 180; 177 Muslims and 3 Orthodox Christians. This had increased by the time of the 1931 census to 250, 245 Muslims and 5 Christians, in 60 houses.

In the 1945 statistics the population was 300, all Muslims, while the total land area was 7,565  dunams, according to an official land and population survey. Of  this, 2,961  were  plantations and irrigable land, 1,423  for cereals, while 40 dunams were classified as built-up (urban) areas.

Jordanian era
In the wake of the 1948 Arab–Israeli War, and after the 1949 Armistice Agreements, Al-Janiya came under Jordanian rule.

The Jordanian census of 1961 found 451 inhabitants in Janiya.

Post-1967
Since the Six-Day War in 1967,  Al-Janiya has been under Israeli occupation.

After the 1995 accords, 7.9% of village land was classified as Area B, the remaining 92.1% as Area C. 867 dunams of land was confiscated for the Israeli settlement of Dolev, in addition to 1,667 dunams for the settlement of Talmon.

In 1989, 4,000 acres of privately owned  land in Al-Janiya was confiscated and given to the Israeli settlement of Talmon. By 2010, Al-Janiya had lost 10,000 acres due to Israeli confiscations.

By 2012, Israeli settlers regularly came armed, taking control of a local water source. The spring, Ein El Masraj, earlier used  for irrigation by Al-Janiya, had been physically taken over by Israeli settlers from Talmon, who had renamed it Ein Talmon. The spring Ein El Mallah, used by Al-Janiya both for domestic use and irrigation, was in danger of being taken over.

By 2014, farming on local land was difficult, since Israeli authorities have declared much of it, enclosing olive groves, a 'closed military zone', which Palestinian farmers are allowed to access on average only two days a year, and many of the trees are uprooted by settlers.

In November 2016, Israeli settlers  attacked four Palestinian farmers while they were harvesting their olives. The settlers, according to Palestinian witnesses and victims, shouted  "Kill the Arabs" and "we will kill you, you sluts", and were armed with knives and clubs. After beating them up, they were filmed returning to an outpost below  Neria, Mateh Binyamin.

References

Bibliography

External links
Welcome To al-Janiya
Survey of Western Palestine, Map 14:  IAA, Wikimedia commons 
 Al Janiya Village (Fact Sheet),  Applied Research Institute–Jerusalem, ARIJ
 Al Janiya Village Profile, ARIJ
Al Janiya, aerial photo, ARIJ
Locality Development Priorities and Needs in Al Janiya Village, ARIJ

Villages in the West Bank
Ramallah and al-Bireh Governorate
Municipalities of the State of Palestine